Avila Convent is a convent school for girls in Coimbatore, Tamil Nadu, India. It is recognized by the Board of Matriculation schools under the Education Department of Tamil Nadu, and trains students for the X and XII Board exams. It is one of the few schools in Coimbatore with ISO 9001 certification.

Patronage 
The school's patron saint is Saint Teresa of Avila, christened after the province Avila in Spain, and the convent motto is "Love, Truth and Service".

Avila Convent Mat. Hr. Sec School is run by the sisters of the Congregation of Mother of Carmel (CMC), a large congregation of sisters founded by the Blessed Kuriakose Elias Chavara, with over 6000 sisters working all over India and abroad. The charism of this congregation is 'contemplation in action'.

Origin
The school in Coimbatore was started in 1967. Currently over 3000 children study in various classes of the school starting from kindergarten to XII grade. The medium of instruction is English, while Tamil is taught as a second language and Hindi as an optional language.

Activities
The school has five houses Love (Red), Truth (Yellow), Service (Blue), Joy (Purple) and Peace (Green). The students represent their respective houses in various competitions, house matches and in the events that take place on sports day. The school has a Maths club, Science club, Literary club, Liturgy club and a Celebration club that organize various events all through the school year and provide opportunities for the children to exhibit their talents. The school has separate laboratories for Physics, Chemistry, Botany, Zoology and Computer Science.

Kids Day is organised every year for children from classes LKG to V. The school day is celebrated annually around January-February. A food festival is conducted annually to raise funds for various social service causes. The school has an official band which has gained extreme popularity around the city over the years and has won many laurels. The school follows the democratic policy of its pupils electing their School Pupil leader and Assistant School Pupil leader. The school has a parliament which consists of a minister and deputy minister for every department which includes Education, Discipline, Social Service, Literature and Fine Arts. In 2016, the school launched an official customized "My Stamp" to commemorate the Golden Jubilee year.

Related Institutions
Sister concerns in and around Tamil Nadu are,
 Vimal Jyothi Mat.Hr.Sec.School, Saravanampatti
 Little Flower Convent Mat.Hr.Sec.School, Tiruppur
 Infant Jesus Mat School, Thekkupalayam
 Lourde Matha Mat.Hr.Sec.School, Udumalpet
 Infant Jesus Society for Education and Training for Hearing impaired (Deaf & Dumb), Thekkupalayam.

Notable people
Sai Pallavi Indian actress, alumni of Avila convent

Timeline
 June 1967: Birth of Avila Convent School with 94 students, designed by the Provincial Superior Mary Patience.
 June 1968: The first block of the school building is completed and the same is inaugurated in December 1968
 April 1972: Recognition from the University of Madras for 9th standard.
 July 1978: Inauguration of the Higher Secondary classes by special officer of Coimbatore Municipality, Mr. Aadimoolam
 Oct 1978: Permanent recognition
 Oct 1991: Silver Jubilee Academic Year.
 June 1994: New Nursery Block inaugurated.
 June 1996: Sr. Patrick, the then principal was awarded 'State Best Teacher'.
 Nov 1996: Children’s Amusement Park inaugurated by Worship Mayor Gopala Krishnan
 Sept 1998: The Principal was conferred the title 'Vidya Ratna'. Velankanni statue installed near the gate. In 1998, Indhu was awarded State Rank in English under Mrs. Hemalatha's most encouraging guidance.
 Feb 2001: New Chapel blessed by Mar Jacob Manathodath, Bishop of Palakkad. In 2001 Sangeetha Ramani received stated second in Hindi in Higher Secondary examination.
 May 2003: The principal Rev. Sr. Patrick received 'Outstanding Teacher Award'. Rating conducted by Sun TV for academic excellence, Avila was placed first in the district of Coimbatore and Nilgiris and fifth place in the State of Tamil Nadu.
 May 2004: 'Commendation Award' and 'Visishta Seva Award' were received by the principal Rev. Sr. Patrick. Rating conducted by Sun TV for Academic excellence, Avila was placed first in the district of Coimbatore and Nilgiris and third in the State of Tamil Nadu.
 Feb 2005:  Became ISO 9001 – 2000 accredited school
 Nov 2015 : Golden Jubilee Year Inaugurated, with Sr. Shalini as Principal.
 Nov 2016 : Actress Sai Pallavi, Avila Alumni paid a visit to the school.
 January 2017 : The school celebrated its Golden Jubilee.

References

External links
http://www.avila.ac.in/

Carmelite educational institutions
Catholic secondary schools in India
Christian schools in Tamil Nadu
Primary schools in Tamil Nadu
High schools and secondary schools in Tamil Nadu
Schools in Coimbatore
Educational institutions established in 1967
1967 establishments in Madras State